EsselWorld is an amusement park located in Gorai on Dharavi island, Mumbai. It  covers an area of 65 acres along with Water Kingdom, and was opened to the public in 1989. Along with Adlabs Imagica, EsselWorld is one of the largest amusement parks in India. The park has been temporarily closed until further notice since April 2022.

EsselWorld has been involved in multiple controversies. The original land acquisition for 700 acres was mired in controversy and claimed to be illegal. Additionally, there have been allegations of illegal destruction of mangroves and violation of coastal zone regulations.

References 

Amusement parks in India
Tourist attractions in Mumbai
1989 establishments in Maharashtra
Amusement parks opened in 1989